The 19th parallel north is a circle of latitude that is 19 degrees north of the Earth's equatorial plane. It crosses Africa, Asia, the Indian Ocean, the Pacific Ocean, North America, the Caribbean and the Atlantic Ocean.

At this latitude the sun is visible for 13 hours, 17 minutes during the summer solstice and 10 hours, 59 minutes during the winter solstice.

Around the world
Starting at the Prime Meridian and heading eastwards, the parallel 19° north passes through:

{| class="wikitable plainrowheaders"
! scope="col" width="125" | Co-ordinates
! scope="col" | Country, territory or sea
! scope="col" | Notes
|-
| 
! scope="row" | 
|
|-
| 
! scope="row" | 
|
|-
| 
! scope="row" | 
|
|-
| 
! scope="row" | 
|
|-
| 
! scope="row" | 
|
|-
| 
! scope="row" | 
|
|- 
| style="background:#b0e0e6;" | 
! scope="row" style="background:#b0e0e6;" | Indian Ocean
| style="background:#b0e0e6;" | Red Sea
|-
| 
! scope="row" | 
|-
| 
! scope="row" | 
|
|-
| style="background:#b0e0e6;" | 
! scope="row" style="background:#b0e0e6;" | Indian Ocean
| style="background:#b0e0e6;" | Arabian Sea
|-valign="top"
| 
! scope="row" | 
| Maharashtra - passing through Mumbai Telangana  Andhra PradeshChhattisgarh Orissa
|-
| style="background:#b0e0e6;" | 
! scope="row" style="background:#b0e0e6;" | Indian Ocean
| style="background:#b0e0e6;" | Bay of Bengal
|-
| 
! scope="row" |  (Burma)
|
|-
| 
! scope="row" | 
|
|-
| 
! scope="row" | 
|
|-
| 
! scope="row" | 
| For about 5 km
|-
| 
! scope="row" | 
| For about 2 km
|-
| 
! scope="row" | 
|
|-
| style="background:#b0e0e6;" | 
! scope="row" style="background:#b0e0e6;" | Pacific Ocean
| style="background:#b0e0e6;" | Gulf of Tonkin, South China Sea
|-
| 
! scope="row" | 
| Island of Hainan
|-
| style="background:#b0e0e6;" | 
! scope="row" style="background:#b0e0e6;" | Pacific Ocean
| style="background:#b0e0e6;" | Passing between Dalupiri Island and Fuga Island, South China Sea
|-
| 
! scope="row" | 
| Camiguin Island
|-valign="top"
| style="background:#b0e0e6;" | 
! scope="row" style="background:#b0e0e6;" | Pacific Ocean
| style="background:#b0e0e6;" | Philippine Sea Passing just north of Agrihan island,  into an unnamed part of the Ocean Passing just south of Wake Island, 
|-
| 
! scope="row" | 
| Hawaii island, Hawaii
|-
| style="background:#b0e0e6;" | 
! scope="row" style="background:#b0e0e6;" | Pacific Ocean
| style="background:#b0e0e6;" |
|-
| 
! scope="row" | 
| Roca Partida, Revillagigedo Islands
|-valign="top"
| style="background:#b0e0e6;" | 
! scope="row" style="background:#b0e0e6;" | Pacific Ocean
| style="background:#b0e0e6;" | Passing just north of Socorro Island, Revillagigedo Islands, 
|-
| 
! scope="row" | 
|
|-
| style="background:#b0e0e6;" | 
! scope="row" style="background:#b0e0e6;" | Atlantic Ocean
| style="background:#b0e0e6;" | Bay of Campeche, Gulf of Mexico
|-
| 
! scope="row" | 
| Yucatán Peninsula
|-
| style="background:#b0e0e6;" | 
! scope="row" style="background:#b0e0e6;" | Atlantic Ocean
! scope="row" style="background:#b0e0e6;" | Caribbean SeaPassing just north of Gonâve Island, 
|-
| 
! scope="row" | 
|
|-
| 
! scope="row" | 
|
|-
| style="background:#b0e0e6;" | 
! scope="row" style="background:#b0e0e6;" | Atlantic Ocean
| style="background:#b0e0e6;" | Passing just north of Anegada island, 
|-
| 
! scope="row" | 
|
|-
| 
! scope="row" | 
|
|}

See also
18th parallel north
20th parallel north

References

n19